Lies Rustenburg (born 8 April 1990) is a Dutch rower who competes in the eights. She won silver medals at the 2015 and 2016 European Championships and placed sixth at the 2016 Rio Olympics.

References

External links

 

1990 births
Living people
Dutch female rowers
Olympic rowers of the Netherlands
Rowers at the 2016 Summer Olympics
Place of birth missing (living people)
European Rowing Championships medalists
20th-century Dutch women
20th-century Dutch people
21st-century Dutch women